Jhingran is a village situated in Nawanshahr district (also known as Shahid Bhagat Singh Nagar) in Punjab, India.

References 

Nawanshahr
Villages in Shaheed Bhagat Singh Nagar district